Dibromodiethyl sulfide is a chemical like mustard gas in which bromine replaces chlorine. It is very irritating as a vapour.

Production
Dibromodiethyl sulfide can be produced by the reaction of bromine with thiodiglycol.

Properties
Dibromodiethyl sulfide takes the form of white crystals. The melting point is between 31 and 34°C. It decomposes when heated to 240°C.

The fungus Tyromyces palustris can split the molecule at the sulfur.

References

Sulfur mustards